HRF may refer to:

 Croatian Radio Festival
 Haemodynamic response function
 Haiti Reconstruction Fund
 Heterocyclic ring fission, a fragmentation scheme in mass spectrometry; see A-type proanthocyanidin
 Homeland Reserve Forces, a branch of the Republic of Korea Reserve Forces
 Hostage Rescue Force, an Egyptian police unit
 Hostile Resting Face, an unintentionally annoyed-looking facial expression
 Human-Readable Format
 Human Relief Foundation
 Human Rights First
 Human Rights Foundation
 Human Rights Foundation (New Zealand)
 Swedish Hotel and Restaurant Workers' Union
 Hailemariam and Roman Foundation